Jean Gilbert (11 February 1879 – 20 December 1942), born Max Winterfeld, was a German operetta composer and conductor.

Life and career
Gilbert was born in Hamburg into a family of musicians; his ancestors were cantors of the Jewish community, his cousin Paul Dessau became a famous composer and conductor. He attended composition lessons held by Philipp Scharwenka in Berlin and studied at the conservatories in Sondershausen and Weimar. After first public appearances as a pianist, the 18-year-old obtained an appointment as Kapellmeister in Bremerhaven. Soon after he moved to the Carl Schultze Theater in Hamburg and, at the age of 20, succeeded Leo Fall as musical director of the Centralhalle theatre.

He adopted the name of Jean Gilbert for the production of his first operetta Das Jungfernstift in 1901. He continued to work as a Kapellmeister at the Berlin Apollo-Theater on Friedrichstraße, where he enacted operettas by Paul Lincke. In 1908, Gilbert moved to Düsseldorf and again turned to composing. Back in Berlin by 1910, he composed more than 50 operettas before and after World War I. His most successful work was Die keusche Susanne (1910), which was also popular in an English adaptation as The Girl in the Taxi.

As a Jew, Gilbert was forced to leave Germany after the Nazi seizure of power in January 1933. He first emigrated to Madrid and later to Argentina, where he once again worked as a radio orchestra leader. He died in Buenos Aires. His elder son Robert Gilbert (1899–1978) was also a composer, his younger son Henry Winterfeld (1901–1990) became a well-known author of books for young readers.

Selected works
Das Jungfernstift, 1901, Hamburg
Polnische Wirtschaft, 1909, Cottbus
Die keusche Susanne, 1910, Magdeburg
Das Autoliebchen, 1912, Berlin
Ja, das haben die Mädchen so gerne
Puppchen, 1912, Berlin
Puppchen, du bist mein Augenstern
Die Kino-Königin, 1913
Die Frau im Hermelin, 1919, Berlin
Katja, die Tänzerin, 1923, Vienna
Das Weib in Purpur, 1923, Vienna
Annemarie, 1925, Berlin
Yvonne, 1926, London (with Vernon Duke)
Hotel Stadt Lemberg, 1929, Hamburg

Selected filmography
 One Hour of Happiness (1931)
 The Girl and the Boy (1931)
 Two Hearts Beat as One (1932)

References
Reclams Operettenführer, Anton Würz (ed.), Stuttgart 1962

Specific

External links
 

Stage works

1879 births
1942 deaths
German classical composers
German male classical composers
German operetta composers
Jewish emigrants from Nazi Germany to Argentina
Musicians from Hamburg